Luis Rosado (26 August 1921 – 6 June 2007) was an Argentine wrestler. He competed in the men's Greco-Roman lightweight at the 1948 Summer Olympics.

References

External links
 

1921 births
2007 deaths
Argentine male sport wrestlers
Olympic wrestlers of Argentina
Wrestlers at the 1948 Summer Olympics
Place of birth missing
20th-century Argentine people
21st-century Argentine people